Objective Interface Systems, Inc. is a computer communications software and hardware company.  The company's headquarters are in Herndon, Virginia, USA. OIS develops, manufactures, licenses, and supports software and hardware products that generally fit into one or more of the following markets:

 Real-time communications middleware software and hardware
 Embedded communications middleware software and hardware
 High-performance communications middleware software and hardware
 Secure communications software and hardware

A popular OIS product is the ORBexpress CORBA middleware software. ORBexpress is most popular in the real-time and embedded computer markets. OIS supports the software version ORBexpress on more than 6,000 computing platforms (combinations of the versions of CPU families, operating systems, and language compilers). OIS also has FPGA versions of ORBexpress to allow hardware blocks on an FPGA to interoperate with software.

OIS engineers invented a form of communications security called the Partitioning Communication System or PCS. The PCS is a technical architecture that protects multiple Information Flows from influencing each other when communicated on a single network wire. The PCS is best implemented on a software separation operating system such as SELinux or a separation kernel.

OIS's communications products are most frequently found in the enterprise, telecom/datacom, mil/aero, medical, robotics, process control and transportation industries. Objective Interface is a privately held company and has developed software products since 1989 and hardware products since 2001.

The Company is actively involved with various standards groups including:

 Common Criteria
 IEEE
 Network Centric Operations Industry Consortium
 Object Management Group (OMG)
 The Open Group
 Wireless Innovation Forum

Corporate Headquarters 

OIS headquarters is located at 220 Spring Street, Herndon, VA, 20170-6201.

References

External links

Objective interface
Objective Interface Systems - 'Official website'
 Object Management Group (OMG) 
 The Open Group  
 Wireless Innovation Forum 

Common Object Request Broker Architecture
Companies based in Fairfax County, Virginia
Software companies based in Virginia
Computer hardware companies
Software companies of the United States